A cold-energy battery utilizes the properties of an advanced phase-change material (PCM) to maintain temperature as battery thermal management. As with a standard electrical battery, a cold energy battery stores energy and releases depending on the energy demand on it. It can then be recharged by placing in a temperature environment conducive to the phase change properties of the PCM.

References

External links
 "Phase Change Material in Battery Thermal Management Applications" retrieved May 3,2018
Battery types